Cylindropuntia wolfii is a species of cactus known by the common name Wolf's cholla.

Distribution
Cylindropuntia wolfii is native to Sonoran Desert, in the Colorado Desert of Southern California, and in Baja California, Mexico. It grows in dry, rocky desert habitat.

Description
Cylindropuntia wolfii is an erect cactus which can approach 2 meters in maximum height. It has many narrow branches made up of woolly, yellowish green, cylindrical segments, the surface divided into wide tubercles bearing many brownish spines up to 3 centimeters in length.

The flower is brownish purple outside to yellowish green in the center. The bumpy, spiny, dry fruit is up to 3 centimeters long.

External links
Cylindropuntia wolfii photo gallery at Cholla Web
Jepson Manual Treatment for Cylindropuntia wolfii
Flora of North America
Cylindropuntia wolfii — UC Photo gallery

wolfii
Cacti of Mexico
Cacti of the United States
Flora of the California desert regions
Flora of the Sonoran Deserts
Flora of Baja California
Natural history of the Colorado Desert
Natural history of Imperial County, California
Flora without expected TNC conservation status